Jayne Cortez (May 10, 1934 – December 28, 2012) was an African-American poet, activist, small press publisher and spoken-word performance artist whose voice is celebrated for its political, surrealistic and dynamic innovations in lyricism and visceral sound. Her writing is part of the canon of the Black Arts Movement. She was married to jazz saxophonist Ornette Coleman from 1954 to 1964, and their son is jazz drummer Denardo Coleman. In 1975, Cortez married painter, sculptor, and printmaker Melvin Edwards, and they lived in Dakar, Senegal, and New York City.

Biography
Jayne Cortez was born Sallie Jayne Richardson on the Army base at Fort Huachuca, Arizona, on May 10, 1934. Her father was a career soldier who served in both world wars; her mother was a secretary. She is the second-born of three children with an older sister and a younger brother.

At the age of seven, she moved to Los Angeles, where she grew up in the Watts district. Young Jayne Richardson reveled in the jazz and Latin recordings that her parents collected. She studied art, music and drama in high school. Later she attended Compton Community College, but dropped out of her course work due to financial difficulties.[11] She took the surname Cortez, the maiden name of her Filipino maternal grandmother, early in her artistic career.

In 1954, Cortez married jazz saxophonist Ornette Coleman when she was 18 years old. Their son Denardo, born in 1956, began drumming with his father while still a child and devoted his adult life to collaborating with both parents in their respective careers. In 1964, Cortez divorced Coleman and founded the Watts Repertory Theater Company, of which she served as artistic director until 1970. Active in the struggle for Civil Rights, she collaborated with famous Civil Rights activist Fannie Lou Hamer and strongly advocated using art as a vehicle to push political causes, with her work being used to register black voters in Mississippi in the early 1960s. Upon reflecting on this time in a 1990 interview with D. H. Melhem, Cortez spoke of its influences on her work, saying: "Being unemployed and without food can make you very sad. But you weren't the problem. The problem existed before you knew there was a problem. The problem is the system, and you can organize, unify, and do something about the system. That's what I learned." She traveled through Europe and Africa, and moved to New York City in 1967.

In 1969 her first collection, Pissstained Stairs and the Monkey Man's Wares, was published and Cortez went on to become the author of 11 other books of poems, and performed her poetry with music on nine recordings. Most of her work was issued under the auspices of Bola Press, a publishing company she founded in 1971. From 1977 to 1983, Cortez was an English teacher for Rutgers University.[3] She presented her work and ideas at universities, museums, and festivals in Africa, Asia, Europe, South America, the Caribbean and the United States. Her poems have been translated into 28 languages and widely published in anthologies, journals and magazines, including Postmodern American Poetry, Daughters of Africa, Poems for the Millennium, Mother Jones, and The Jazz Poetry Anthology.

In 1975 she married sculptor and printmaker Melvin Edwards, and they lived in Dakar, Senegal, and New York City. His work appeared in her publications as well as on some of her album covers. Cortez and Edwards maintained two residences, one in New York City and one in Dakar, Senegal, which Cortez said "really feels like home."

Cortez died of heart failure in Manhattan, New York, on December 28, 2012, aged 78.

Poetry and performance
The musicians with whom Cortez aligned herself reflected the sociopolitical and cultural elements to which she attached the greatest importance. Born in Fort Huachuca, Arizona, in 1934, she grew up near Los Angeles under the spell of her parents' jazz and blues record collection, which also included examples of Latin American dance bands and field recordings of indigenous American music. Raised in a musically artistic household, in "some of her poems about musicians, Cortez addresses the dark side of a life in music, exploring the addiction and loneliness that many believe are inherently linked to a life in the performing arts."[3] Early exposure to the recordings of Bessie Smith instilled in Cortez a deeply etched sense of female identity, which, combined with a strong will, shaped her into an uncommonly outspoken individual. She became transformed by the sounds of Duke Ellington, Sarah Vaughan, Charlie Parker, Dizzy Gillespie, and no-nonsense vocalist Dinah Washington, whose visceral approach to self-expression clearly encouraged the poet not to pull any punches.

Cortez, who respected the memory of independent performing artist Josephine Baker, preferred to name inspirations rather than influences, especially when discussing writers. Those with whom she identified included Langston Hughes, Aimé Césaire, Léon Damas, Christopher Okigbo, Henry Dumas, Amiri Baraka, and Richard Wright. Parallels with the ugly/beautiful poetics of Federico García Lorca also suggest themselves. Her words were usually written, chanted, and spoken in rhythmic repetition that resembled the intricate, tactile language of African and Caribbean drumming.

Most of her work from the early 1970s onwards was issued by Bola Press, the publishing company she founded. One of these early works, Festivals and Funerals(1971), while not as well known as Pissstained stairs and the Monkey Man's Wares, is considered significant from how much it derives from Cortez's personal experiences, as well as featuring "the voices of ordinary working people confronting social issues and weighing their role in fighting for change."[3] She cut her first album, Celebrations and Solitudes, at White Plains, New York, in 1974. A set of duets with bassist Richard Davis, it was released on the Strata-East label. The first Bola Press recording, taped in October 1979, was called Unsubmissive Blues and included a piece "For the Brave Young Students in Soweto." Cortez delivered her poetry backed by an electro-funk modern jazz group called the Firespitters, built around a core of guitarist Bern Nix, bassist Al McDowell, and drummer Denardo Coleman. For years, the Firespitters and Ornette Coleman's Prime Time coexisted with Denardo as the axis and various players participated in both units.

During the summer of 1982, Cortez delivered There It Is, an earthshaking album containing several pieces that truly define her artistry. These include: "I See Chano Pozo," a joyously evocative salute to Dizzy Gillespie's legendary Cuban percussionist; a searing indictment of patriarchal violence called "If the Drum Is a Woman", and, "US/Nigerian Relations," which consists of the sentence "They want the oil/but they don't want the people" chanted dervish-like over an escalating, electrified free jazz blowout. Recorded in 1986, her next album, Maintain Control, is especially memorable for Ornette Coleman's profoundly emotive saxophone on "No Simple Explanations," the unsettling "Deadly Radiation Blues," and the harshly gyrating "Economic Love Song," which is another of her tantrum-like repetition rituals, this time built around the words "Military spending, huge profits and death." Among several subsequent albums Cheerful & Optimistic (1994) stands out for the use of an African kora player and poignant currents of wistfulness during "Sacred Trees" and "I Wonder Who." Additionally, this album contains a convincing ode to anti-militarism in "War Devoted to War" and the close-to-the-marrow mini-manifestos "Samba Is Power" and "Find Your Own Voice." In 1996, her album Taking the Blues Back Home was released on Harmolodic/Verve; Borders of Disorderly Time, which appeared in 2002, featured guest artists Bobby Bradford, Ron Carter, and James Blood Ulmer.

She appeared on screen in the films Women in Jazz and Poetry in Motion by Ron Mann.

Her impact upon the development of spoken-word performance art during the late 20th century has yet to be intelligently recognized. In some ways her confrontational political outspokenness and dead-serious cathartic performance technique place Cortez in league with Judith Malina and The Living Theater. According to the online African-American Registry, " her ability to push the acceptable limits of expression to address issues of race, sex and homophobia place her in a category that few other women occupy."

Organization of Women Writers of Africa
In 1991, along with Ghanaian writer Ama Ata Aidoo, Cortez co-founded the Organization of Women Writers of Africa (OWWA), and served as its president for many years thereafter, with board members including J. e. Franklin, Cheryll Y. Greene, Rashidah Ismaili, and Louise Meriwether, Maya Angelou, Rosamond S. King, Margaret Busby, Gabrielle Civil, Alexis De Veaux, LaTasha N. Diggs, Zetta Elliott, Donette Francis, Paula Giddings, Renée Larrier, Tess Onwueme, Coumba Touré, Maryse Condé, Nancy Morejón, and Sapphire. In 1997 OWAA organized "the first major international conference devoted to the evaluation and celebration of literature from around the world by women of African descent". Cortez directed Yari Yari: Black Women Writers and the Future (1999), which documented panels, readings and performances held during that conference. She was also organizer of "Slave Routes: The Long Memory" (2000) and "Yari Yari Pamberi: Black Women Writers Dissecting Globalization" (2004), both international conferences held at New York University.

Until shortly before her death Cortez had been planning an OWAA symposium of women writers to be held in Accra, Ghana, which took place as scheduled, in her honour, May 16–19, 2013.

Tributes
A memorial celebration of her life, organised by her family on February 6, 2013, at the Cooper Union Foundation Building, included tributes by Amiri Baraka, Danny Glover, Robin Kelley, Genna Rae McNeil, Quincy Troupe, Steve Dalachinsky, George Campbell Jr., Eugene Redmond, Rashidah Ismaili, and Manthia Diawara, as well as musical contributions by Randy Weston, T. K. Blue and The Firespitters.

The Spring 2013 issue of The Black Scholar (Vol. 43, No. 1/2) was dedicated to her memory and work.

In London, on July 19, 2013, a tribute event was held, with featured artists including John Agard, Jean "Binta" Breeze, Denardo Coleman, Zena Edwards, Linton Kwesi Johnson, Grace Nichols, Deirdre Pascall, Keith Waithe, Margaret Busby, and others.

Selected awards
 1970, Rockefeller Foundation grant
 1980, American Book Award for Mouth on Paper
 1987, National Endowment for the Arts
 1994, Fannie Lou Hamer Award
 1996, Arts International Award
 International African Festival Award
 2001, Langston Hughes Medal
 New York Foundation for the Arts

Poetry books

 
 
 
 
 
 
 Firespitter, Bola Press (1982)
 Mouth on Paper, Bola Press (1977)
 Scarifications, Bola Press (1973)
 Festivals and Funerals, Bola Press (1971)
 Pissstained Stairs and the Monkey Man's Wares, Phrase Text (1969)

Discography
 As If You Knew  (Bola Press, 2011)
 Find Your Own Voice: Poetry and Music, 1982–2003 (Bola Press, 2004)
 Borders of Disorderly Time (Bola Press, 2002)
 Taking the Blues Back Home (Harmolodic/Verve, 1996)
 Cheerful & Optimistic (Bola Press, 1994)
 Poetry & Music: Women in (E)Motion Festival (Tradition & Moderne Musikproducktion, Germany, 1992)
 Everywhere Drums (Bola Press, 1990)
 Maintain Control (Bola Press, 1986)
 There It Is (Bola Press, 1982)
 Life is a Killer (compilation on Giorno Poetry Systems, 1982)
 Poets Read their Contemporary Poetry: Before Columbus Foundation (Smithsonian Folkways, 1980)
 Unsubmissive Blues (Bola Press, 1979)
 Celebrations & Solitudes: The Poetry of Jayne Cortez & Richard Davis, Bassist (Strata-East, 1974)

Videos
 Find Your Own Voice (Sanctuary TV, 2010)
 She Got He Got (Sanctuary TV, 2010)
 I'm Gonna Shake (Sanctuary TV, 2010)
 Tribeca TV Series (David J. Burke, 1993)

Filmography
 Femmes du Jazz/Women in Jazz (2000)
 Yari Yari: Black Women Writers and the Future (1999)
 Ornette: Made in America (1985)
 Poetry in Motion (1982)

References

Critical reviews, interviews, and scholarly references 
 Anderson III, T. J. Notes to Make the Sound Come Right: Four Innovators of Jazz Poetry. Fayetteville: University of Arkansas Press, 2004.
 Benston, Kimberly W. "Renovating blackness: Remembrance and revolution in the Coltrane Poem." Performing Blackness: Enactments of African-American Modernism. London: Routledge, 2000.
 Bolden, Tony. Afro-blue: Improvisations in African American Poetry and Culture. Urbana: Illinois University Press, 2004.
 Boyd, Herb. "Everywhere Drums." The Black Scholar. 21.4 (1991): 41.
 Brown, Kimberly N. "Return to the Flesh: The Revolutionary Ideology behind the Poetry of Jayne Cortez." Writing the Black Revolutionary Diva: Women's Subjectivity and the Decolonizing Text. Bloomington: Indiana University Press, 2010. 
 Clarke, Cheryl. "After Mecca": Women Poets and the Black Arts Movement. New Brunswick, N.J: Rutgers University Press, 2005.
 Feinstein, Sascha. Ask Me Now: Conversations on Jazz & Literature. Bloomington: Indiana University Press, 2007.
 Feinstein, Sascha. Jazz Poetry: From the 1920s to the Present. Westport, CT: Greenwood Press, 1997. 
 Ford, Karen. "On Cortez’s Poetry". Modern American Poetry.
 Iannapollo, Robert. "Jayne Cortez/Firespitters, Cheerful & Optimistic, Bola 9401." Cadence. 21.2 (1995): 96–97.
 Jones, Meta D. E. The Muse Is Music: Jazz Poetry from the Harlem Renaissance to Spoken Word. Urbana: University of Illinois Press, 2011.
 Kingan, Renee M. "‘Taking It Out!’: Jayne Cortez's Collaborations with the Firespitters." in Thompson, Gordon. Black Music, Black Poetry: Blues and Jazz's Impact on African American Versification. London: Ashgate, 2014.
 Lavazzi, Tom. "Echoes of DuBois: The Crisis Writings and Jayne Cortez’s Earlier Poetry." Blevins, Jacob. Dialogism and Lyric Self-Fashioning: Bakhtin and the Voices of a Genre. Selinsgrove, Pa: Susquehanna University Press, 2008. 
 McCarthy, Albert J. "Jazz and Poetry." Jazz Monthly. 3.10 (December 1957): 9–10. 
 Melhem, D. H. "A MELUS Profile and Interview: Jayne Cortez." MELUS. 21.1 (1996): 71–79.
 Meehan, Kevin. "Red Pepper Poetry: Jayne Cortez and Cross-Cultural Saturation." People Get Ready: African American and Caribbean Cultural Exchange. Jackson: University Press of Mississippi, 2009.
 Melhem, D. H. Heroism in the New Black Poetry: Introductions and Interviews. Lexington: Kentucky University Press, 1990.
 Nielsen, Aldon Lynn. Integral Music: Languages of African American Innovation. Tuscaloosa: Alabama University Press, 2004.
 Pareles, Jon. "Setting Agitprop Poetry To the Beat of Current Jazz." The New York Times March 25, 1991: C14.
 Rambsy, Howard. The Black Arts Enterprise and the Production of African American Poetry. Ann Arbor: University of Michigan Press, 2011.
 Richmond, Norman. "Jayne Cortez: ‘It’s What We’ve Been Doing All Our Lives.’" Fuse. 6.1–2 (1982): 73–76.
 Ruffin, Kimberly N. "Dispatch from a Diaspora’s Daughter: an Interview with Jayne Cortez." Abafazi. 13.1 (2005): 13–16.
 Ruffin, Kimberly N. "‘Freedom of Expression’ Meet Jayne Cortez." Footsteps. 7.2 (2005): 27.
 Ryan, Jennifer D. "Talk to Me: Ecofeminist Disruptions in the Jazz Poetry of Jayne Cortez." Post-Jazz Poetics: A Social History. New York: Palgrave Macmillan, 2010.
 Sakolsky, Ron. "Firespitter: Jayne Cortez and the Poetics of Diasporic Resistance." LiP Magazine.  
 Wilmer, Val. "Jayne Cortez: the Unsubmissive Blues." CODA. 230 (1990): 16–19.
 Wilson, John S. "Music: Poetry and Jazz." The New York Times. June 9, 1970: 36.
 Woessner, Warren. "Unsubmissive Blues." Small Press Review. 15.3 (1981). 
 Woods, Luke. "Cortez McAndless Distinguished Professor Poet to grace EMU with her Lyrical Stylings." Echo Online.

External links 
 Official Website
 Academy of American Poets
 Modern American Poetry
 Poetry Foundation
 "Artists On The Cutting Edge: Jayne Cortez", University of California Television (UCTV)
 Marc Reyes, "Black Experience in the Arts: Poet and Activist Jayne Cortez", UConn Library, October 4, 2016.

1934 births
2012 deaths
20th-century African-American women writers
20th-century African-American writers
20th-century American poets
20th-century American women writers
21st-century African-American women writers
21st-century African-American writers
21st-century American poets
21st-century American women writers
Activists from California
African-American musicians
African-American poets
African-American publishers (people)
African-American women musicians
American Book Award winners
American publishers (people)
American spoken word poets
American women poets
Avant-garde art
Jazz poetry
Musicians from Arizona
Musicians from Los Angeles
Poets from Arizona
Small press publishing companies
Strata-East Records artists
Verve Records artists
Writers from Los Angeles